André Fontainas (1865–1948) was a Belgian Symbolist poet and critic. He was born in Brussels. He spent much of his life in France. He taught at Lycee Fontaines.
He was a member of the Académie Mallarmé.

Works

Poetry
 Le sang des fleurs, Imprimerie Veuve Monnom, 1889
 
 Nuits d'Epiphanie 1894
 Les Estuaires d'ombre, 1896
 Crépuscules, 1897
 L'Eau du Fleuve, 1897

L'oeuvre d'André Fontainas, Marguerite Bervoets (ed), Palais des Académies, 1949
Choix de poèmes, Mercure de France, 1950

Novel

Memoirs
 Mes souvenirs du symbolisme, La Nouvelle revue critique, 1928
 Confession d'un poète, Mercure de France, 1936

Non-fiction

Frans Hals, H. Laurens 1908

Courbet, F. Alcan, 1921
La peinture de Daumier, G. Crès et cie, 1923
Constantin Meunier, Alcan, 1923
Rops, F. Alcan, 1925
Constable, Translator Wilfrid Scarborough Jackson, John Lane, 1927
Bonnard, Librairie de France, 1928
Dans la lignée de Baudelaire, La Nouvelle revue critique, 1930
Tableau de la poésie française d'aujourd'hui, La Nouvelle revue critique, 1931
L'Antisémitisme: son histoire et ses causes, J. Crès, 1934

References

1865 births
1948 deaths
Writers from Brussels
Belgian poets in French